Ugashik (Ugaasaq in Sugpiaq) is a census-designated place (CDP) in Lake and Peninsula Borough, Alaska, United States. The population was 4 at the 2020 census, down from 12 in 2010.

Geography
Ugashik is located on the Alaska Peninsula at  (57.534143, -157.268870). The community sits on the east bank of the Ugashik River,  upriver (east) from its mouth in Ugashik Bay, an arm of Bristol Bay of the Bering Sea, and  downriver (west) from the mouth of Lower Ugashik Lake. The CDP extends east as far as the west shores of Lower and Upper Ugashik Lakes.

The proximity to the salmon-rich waters of Ugashik Bay and available fresh water supply made it suitable as a location for a salmon cannery, Alaska Packers which operated until 1957. A family-owned company, Briggs Way Cannery, opened in 1962, and runs to this day. It is currently known as Ugashik Wild Salmon Co. and is continued on by the second generation of family and fishermen.

Demographics

Ugashik first appeared on the 1880 U.S. Census as the unincorporated Aleut village of "Oogashik." Of 177 residents, 176 were Aleut and 1 was Creole (Mixed Russian and Native). It returned in 1890 under the present spelling of Ugashik and also included 2 native settlements and Bering Sea Packing Company. Of 154 residents, 123 were Natives, 20 were White and 11 were Asian. It returned again in 1900 with 348 residents, though the racial breakdown was not ascertained. This was its highest ever population and was the 20th largest community in Alaska. It did not report again until 1930. It continued to report in every successive census except 1970. It was designated an Alaskan Native Village Statistical Area (ANVSA) in 1980. In 2000, it was made a census-designated place (CDP).

As of the census of 2008, there were 12 people, 7 households, and 2 families residing in the CDP. The population density was 0.0 people per square mile (0.0/km2). There were 35 housing units at an average density of 0.1/sq mi (0.1/km2). The racial makeup of the CDP was 18.18% White, 0% Native American, and 79.8 from two or more races, Alaska Native being one of them.

There were 7 households, out of which none had children under the age of 18 living with them, 28.5% were married couples living together, and 71.4% were non-families. 42.9% of all households were made up of individuals, and one had someone living alone who was 65 years of age or older. The average household size was 1.57 and the average family size was 2.00.

In the CDP, the population was spread out, with 0% from 18 to 24, 18.2% from 25 to 44, 72.7% from 45 to 72, . The median age was 50 years. For every 100 females, there were 120.0 males. For every 100 females age 18 and over, there were 120.0 males.

The median income for a household in the CDP was $28,750, and the median income for a family was $35,417. Males had a median income of $0 versus $0 for females. The per capita income for the CDP was $12,530. There were no families and 10.0% of the population living below the poverty line, including no under eighteens and none of those over 64.

References

External links

Lake & Peninsula Borough
Lake and Peninsula School District

Census-designated places in Alaska
Census-designated places in Lake and Peninsula Borough, Alaska